Whitehaven Rugby Union Football Club is an amateur rugby union club based in Whitehaven, in West Cumbria, where they play at The Playground. They currently play in the RFU's Counties 1 Cumbria, a competitive league at Tier 8 in the English Rugby Union System.

Honours

1st team:
Cumbria Cup winners (4): 1884, 1914, 1963, 1969
Cumbria League champions (2): 2005–06, 2009-10
Cumbria Cup Plate winners: 2010
Cumbria League v Lancashire (North) promotion play-off winners: 2011-12
Cumbria League Cup winners: 2018

2nd team:
Cumbria Shield winners (4): 1912, 1932, 1963, 1968

See also
 Cumbria Rugby Union

References

External links
 Official website

English rugby union teams
Rugby clubs established in 1875
Rugby union in Cumbria
1875 establishments in England